Kaarle (Kalle) Fredrik Häkkinen (28 January 1878, in Ruovesi – 25 June 1919) was a Finnish agronomist, farmer, bank director and politician. He was a member of the Diet of Finland from 1904 to 1906 and of the Parliament of Finland from 1917 to 1919. He represented the Finnish Party until 1918 and the National Coalition Party from 1918 to 1919.

References

1878 births
1919 deaths
People from Ruovesi
People from Häme Province (Grand Duchy of Finland)
Finnish Party politicians
National Coalition Party politicians
Members of the Diet of Finland
Members of the Parliament of Finland (1917–19)
People of the Finnish Civil War (White side)
University of Helsinki alumni